Kalman Packouz was an Orthodox rabbi who pioneered various Jewish educational initiatives geared towards baalei teshuva ("returnee to Judaism") outreach.

Biography
Packouz was raised in Portland, Oregon, and attended Temple Beth Israel, a Reform temple. In 1979, after receiving rabbinical ordination in Jerusalem, Packouz started the first Aish HaTorah branch in St. Louis.  Packouz served for ten years as executive director of Aish HaTorah international operations, and was head of the Miami office of Aish HaTorah's worldwide programs.  He was a contributor to simpletoremember.com. He was also a special correspondent for the Sun Sentinel. He was married and the father of nine children, including former international arms dealer and inventor David Packouz. Packouz died in 2019.

Intermarriage book
Packouz spoke out on Jewish continuity through marriage, and in 1976 authored the book, How to Stop an Intermarriage. The book was later expanded and retitled as: How to Prevent an Intermarriage - A Guide For Parents to Prevent Broken Hearts.

Shabbat Shalom Weekly
In 1992, Packouz launched the Shabbat Shalom Weekly, an electronic publication distributed each week via fax and email.

Kotel Webcam
In 1997, Packouz created Window on the Wall, a 24-hour live webcam from the Western Wall in Jerusalem.

References

External links
Shabbat Shalom Weekly
Window on the Western Wall, Israel
 How to Stop an Intermarriage Website

Rabbis of Aish HaTorah
American Haredi rabbis
American Orthodox rabbis
Year of birth missing
2019 deaths
20th-century American rabbis
21st-century American rabbis